The 1852 United States elections elected the members of the 33rd United States Congress. The election marked the end of the Second Party System, as the Whig Party ceased to function as a national party following this election. Democrats won the presidency and retained control of both houses of Congress.

In the presidential election, Democratic former senator Franklin Pierce of New Hampshire defeated Whig General Winfield Scott. Pierce won the popular vote by a margin of seven percent, and dominated the electoral college. John P. Hale of the Free Soil Party also took about five percent of the popular vote. Pierce won on the 49th ballot of the 1852 Democratic National Convention, defeating 1848 nominee Lewis Cass, former Secretary of State James Buchanan, former Secretary of War William L. Marcy, and Senator Stephen A. Douglas from Illinois. Incumbent Whig president Millard Fillmore ran for a full term, but the 1852 Whig National Convention chose Scott, another popular general similar to former Whig presidents William Henry Harrison and Zachary Taylor. Fillmore became the first incumbent president to lose his party's presidential nomination. Scott was the last Whig presidential candidate, as the party collapsed during the 1850s. However, this election was also the last time a Democratic candidate would win a majority of the popular and electoral vote until Franklin D. Roosevelt did so in 1932.

In the House, Democrats won several seats, boosting their majority. In the Senate, Democrats won minor gains, maintaining their commanding majority.

See also
1852 United States presidential election
1852–53 United States House of Representatives elections
1852–53 United States Senate elections

References

 
1852